The Cardroom Amalgamation or Cardroom Workers' Amalgamation (CWA) was a British trade union which existed between 1886 and 1974. It represented workers in the cotton textile industry.

History
The union was founded in 1886 as the Amalgamated Association of Card and Blowing Room Operatives, by the amalgamation of a few small, local unions.  This followed the Oldham weavers' strike of 1885, which had led to non-unionised cardroom workers being locked out and losing their wages.

Affiliates of the union were:

The union represented a wide range of workers in the textile industry, and did not discriminate on the basis of occupation or skill. The core of the union's membership were the strippers and grinders, skilled adult male mechanics, who maintained the carding engines. Almost all strippers and grinders were union members. The CWA also organised less skilled female ring spinners and other mill operatives. From 1904 onwards the only members required to have completed an apprenticeship were the strippers-and-grinders.

The CWA grew rapidly and by 1910 it had 52,000 members. In 1924, it changed its name to the Amalgamated Association of Card and Blowing and Ring Room Operatives, and in 1952 it became the National Association of Card, Blowing and Ring Room Operatives, before adopting its final name, the National Union of Textile and Allied Workers (NUTAW), in 1968.

The CWA was more aggressive in its attitude towards negotiating with employers than the other major cotton unions and by the mid-1960s the wages of strippers and grinders equalled those of mule spinners, traditionally the highest-paid textile workers.

In 1974, the union merged with the Amalgamated Weavers' Association, to form the Amalgamated Textile Workers' Union.

General secretaries
1886: William Mullin
1920: William Thomasson
1935: Alfred Roberts
1962: Joe King

Presidents
1886: George Silk
c.1890: Enoch Jones
1896: James Crinion
1926: Joseph Frayne
1936: Archie Robertson
1953: Harold Chorlton
1964: Jim Browning
1972: Roy Bennett

References

Defunct trade unions of the United Kingdom
1886 establishments in the United Kingdom
Cotton industry trade unions
Trade unions established in 1886
Trade unions disestablished in 1974
Trade unions based in Greater Manchester